John Diffley (born January 11, 1967, in New City, New York) is a retired American soccer player who is currently the Senior Associate Athletic Director for Administration at St. John's University.

Youth and college
Diffley attended Albertus Magnus High School of Rockland, New York where he played on the soccer team from 1981 to 1984. He was a Parade High School All-American and was inducted into the Albertus Magnus Hall of Fame in 1998. In 1985, he entered American University. He spent four seasons as a midfielder with American. During Diffley's freshman year, American went to the NCAA title game where the Eagles fell to the University of California, Los Angeles in eight overtimes. Diffley graduated in 1989 with honors and was inducted into the Hall of Fame in 2006.

Professional
In 1989, Diffley began his professional career with the Albany Capitals of the American Soccer League (ASL). At the conclusion of the ASL season, Diffley signed with the expansion indoor team Atlanta Attack of the American Indoor Soccer Association (AISA). The Attack finished second in the league 1989-1990 standings and went to the playoff semi-finals before losing to the Dayton Dynamo. In the 1990 off-season, the AISA renamed itself the National Professional Soccer League (NPSL). The Attack again finished second in the standings, but fell to Dayton again in the first round of the playoffs. That summer, Diffley moved to the Penn-Jersey Spirit of the American Professional Soccer League (APSL).  Diffley then decided to try a career in Europe. He signed with Dutch Second Division club HFC Haarlem and spent the 1992–1993 season in the Netherlands.  In 1994, Diffley joined the North Jersey Imperials of USISL, where he was captain and was named to the USISL All-Star team. The next season, 1995, he signed with the Long Island Rough Riders. That year, Long Island won the USISL national championship. Diffley was named to the Championship All-Tournament team.  The Tampa Bay Mutiny of Major League Soccer (MLS) drafted Diffley in the third round (twenty-seventh overall) of the 1996 Draft. He saw time in thirteen games before being traded to the Kansas City Wizards for the 1997 season.  When the Wizards released him, Diffley became a full-time coach but continued to play for the Staten Island Vipers in 1998 and 1999.  In 2003, Diffley was a player-assistant coach with the New York Freedom.

Coaching
In 1995, Diffley became the head coach for the Dominican College men's soccer team. In 1997, he moved to St. John's University where he served as an assistant coach with the men's soccer team while working on his master's degree in business administration.

Administration
In 2001, Diffley gained his master's degree and left St. John's to work in the financial industry. On January 1, 2004, Diffley returned to St. John's when the school hired him as its Senior Associate Athletic Director for Administration.

National team
Diffley earned seven caps with the U.S. national team in 1988. He earned his first cap as a substitute for Jeff Agoos in a 1–0 loss to Guatemala on January 10, 1988. Earned eight caps for the U.S. in 1988 when he contended for a spot on the U.S. Olympic Team. His last game came six months later as a substitute for Brian Bliss in a June 12 tie with Ecuador. At the time the national team was preparing for the 1988 Summer Olympics. Diffley was selected as an alternate for the 1988 for the U.S. Olympic Team.

American University inducted Diffley into its Athletic Hall of Fame in 2006.

References

External links
St. John’s University profile

1967 births
Living people
Albany Capitals players
American Eagles men's soccer players
American expatriate soccer players
American expatriate sportspeople in the Netherlands
American Indoor Soccer Association players
American Professional Soccer League players
American soccer coaches
American Soccer League (1988–89) players
American soccer players
Atlanta Attack players
Expatriate footballers in the Netherlands
Association football defenders
Association football midfielders
Association football utility players
Eerste Divisie players
HFC Haarlem players
Long Island Rough Riders players
Major League Soccer players
National Professional Soccer League (1984–2001) players
New York Freedom players
North Jersey Imperials players
Parade High School All-Americans (boys' soccer)
Penn-Jersey Spirit players
People from New City, New York
Staten Island Vipers players
Soccer players from New York (state)
Sporting Kansas City players
Tampa Bay Mutiny players
USISL players
USL Second Division players
United States men's international soccer players
People from Rockland, New York